Charles Edward Daniels (October 28, 1936 – July 6, 2020) was an American singer, musician, and songwriter. His music fused rock, country, blues and jazz, pioneering Southern rock. He was best known for his number-one country hit "The Devil Went Down to Georgia".  Much of his output, including all but one of his eight Billboard Hot 100 charting singles, was credited to the Charlie Daniels Band.

Daniels was active as a singer and musician from the 1950s until his death. He was inducted into the Cheyenne Frontier Days Hall of Fame in 2002, the Grand Ole Opry in 2008, the Musicians Hall of Fame and Museum in 2009, and the Country Music Hall of Fame in 2016.

Early life 

Charles Edward Daniels was born October 28, 1936, in Wilmington, North Carolina to teenage parents William and LaRue Daniel. The "s" in Daniels' name was added by mistake when his birth certificate was filled out. Two weeks after Daniels had begun to attend elementary school, his family moved to Valdosta, Georgia, commuting between that city and Elizabethtown, North Carolina, before moving back to Wilmington. After enduring measles, Daniels would require eyeglasses to see for most of his life afterward, which led to him being bullied by other children at his school. Influenced by Pentecostal gospel, local bluegrass music groups and rhythm and blues artists that he heard on the radio, as well as Western films, Daniels began writing and performing songs.

Career

Sideman career and first rock band
Already skilled on guitar, fiddle, banjo, and mandolin, Daniels began his music career as a member of the bluegrass band Misty Mountain Boys in the 1950s. In the 1960s, Daniels was performing rock and roll. Daniels formed his own band, the Rockets, who later changed their name to the Jaguars after scoring a hit single with the instrumental recording "Jaguar". After discovering jazz, the Jaguars began performing jazz music, before reverting to rock and country music by 1964. During his career as a rock and roll sideman, Daniels also wrote songs for other performers. In July 1963, soul singer Jerry Jackson recorded Daniels' song "It Hurts Me"; the following year, on January 12, 1964, Elvis Presley recorded the better known recording of Daniels' song. The songwriting credits list Charles E. Daniels and Joy Byers as the songwriters, although Byers' husband, songwriter and producer Bob Johnston, was the actual co-writer with Daniels. Johnston encouraged Daniels to move to Nashville in order to get work as a session player, which led to Daniels recording with Bob Dylan on his 1969 album Nashville Skyline, Ringo Starr on his 1970 album Beaucoups of Blues and Leonard Cohen on his 1971 album Songs of Love and Hate, as well as further sessions with Dylan and Cohen's 1971 tour. Dylan and Daniels found each other creatively invigorating during their recordings together, with Dylan saying that "when Charlie was around, something good would usually come out of the sessions", and Daniels describing the recording sessions with Dylan as "loose, free and, most of all, fun". Daniels also produced albums for the Youngbloods, including their 1969 album Elephant Mountain.

Solo career and formation of the Charlie Daniels Band
Daniels released his self-titled debut album in 1970, which helped lay the foundations for Southern rock. Two years later, Daniels formed the Charlie Daniels Band. Daniels scored a Top 10 hit on the Billboard Pop charts with "Uneasy Rider", a talking bluegrass song, in 1973. The following year, Daniels organized the first Volunteer Jam concert. The same year, the Charlie Daniels Band released the gold selling Fire on the Mountain, followed by the even more successful Nightrider, whose success was spurred by the Top 40 hit single "Texas". Saddle Tramp was also a gold seller, and was the first release by the band to reach the top 10 of the Billboard Country charts.

In 1977, the Charlie Daniels Band released their most commercially successful album, Million Mile Reflections, which reached number five and was certified triple-platinum. It featured the single "The Devil Went Down to Georgia", which reached No. 3 on the Billboard Hot 100 in September 1979, and won Daniels the Grammy Award for Best Country Vocal Performance. The band also attracted a high profile fan in President Jimmy Carter, who used Daniels' song "The South's Gonna Do It Again" as Carter's campaign theme; after Carter's win, the band performed at his 1977 inauguration. In 1980, Daniels played himself in the film Urban Cowboy, starring John Travolta, and as a result became closely identified with the revival of country music generated by the film's success. Subsequently, the combination of the success of the more country-oriented song and the decline in popularity of Southern rock led Daniels to shift focus in his sound from rock to country music. After the platinum certified Full Moon (1980) and the gold certified Windows (1982), Daniels would not have another hit album until the 1989 release Simple Man, which earned Daniels another gold album, although the title track sparked controversy, as it was interpreted by some as advocating vigilantism, due to lyrics such as "Just take them rascals [rapists, killers, child abusers] out in the swamp/Put 'em on their knees and tie 'em to a stump/Let the rattlers and the bugs and the alligators do the rest", which garnered Daniels considerable media attention and talk show visits.

Later career
In the 1990s, Daniels' albums failed to chart, although he continued to draw audiences as a concert performer well into the 21st century. In 1995, Daniels released the first of three Christian albums for Sparrow Records, The Door. In 1999, Daniels was inducted into the North Carolina Music Hall of Fame.

The 21st century saw Daniels, who had previously recorded for major labels, predominantly recording for independent record labels. In 2003, Daniels received considerable headlines for his pro-Iraq War anthem "This Ain't No Rag, It's a Flag", which Daniels followed with a book entitled Ain't No Rag. Songs from the Longleaf Pines (2005) marked Daniels' first fully bluegrass and gospel album, and began an association with Koch Records, who began releasing a series of Daniels' albums which included holiday albums, live albums and theme compilations. 

On October 18, 2005, Daniels was honored as a BMI Icon at the 53rd annual BMI Country Awards. The following year, Daniels played in the backup band for Hank Williams Jr.'s opening sequence to Monday Night Football. In November 2007, Daniels was invited to become a member of the Grand Ole Opry. He was inducted during the January 19, 2008, edition of the Opry. In 2009, Daniels was featured playing fiddle in a commercial for GEICO.

In 2016, Daniels released Night Hawks, an album of Western swing music. In October of that year, Daniels became a member of the Country Music Hall of Fame. In March 2017, HarperCollins announced that Daniels's memoir, Never Look at the Empty Seats, would be released on October 24, 2017. In the late 2010s, Daniels, drummer James Stroud, guitarist Billy Crain and bassist Charlie Hayward formed a new band, Beau Weevils, which debuted on the 2018 album Songs in the Key of E, which Daniels described as being in a "down-home, swampy rock meets funk with a little taste of Delta-type of style." On November 6, 2018, Daniels released a book of daily inspirational quotes and stories titled Let's All Make the Day Count: The Everyday Wisdom of Charlie Daniels through HarperCollins's Thomas Nelson imprint.

Musical style

Stephen Thomas Erlewine said that Charlie Daniels' self-titled debut album, released in 1970, was a pivotal recording in the development of the Southern rock genre, "because it points the way to how the genre could and would sound, and how country music could retain its hillbilly spirit and rock like a mother." Erlewine described Daniels as "a redneck rebel, not fitting into either the country or the rock & roll [...] but, in retrospect, he sounds like a visionary, pointing the way to the future when southern rockers saw no dividing lines between rock, country, and blues, and only saw it all as sons of the south." The Charlie Daniels Band fused rock, country, blues, and jazz; Erlewine described the band's sound as "a distinctly Southern blend" which emphasized improvisation in their instrumentation, which was aided by the band utilizing two lead guitarists and two drummers. The New York Times said that Daniels' music incorporated elements of country, blues, bluegrass, rock and Western swing.

After the success of "The Devil Went Down to Georgia", a single which Erlewine described as a "a roaring country-disco fusion", Daniels shifted his sound from rock to country music. In both Daniels' rock and country recordings, Daniels "helped shape the sound of country-rock". Rapper Cowboy Troy said that Charlie Daniels and Jerry Reed's vocal delivery "was called recitations at that time, but if you listened to it now, you'd probably call it a rap". Rolling Stone described "The Devil Went Down to Georgia" as one of the earliest examples of country rap. Regarding his musical style, Daniels said "I never claimed to be country"; Daniels described his style instead as "American music", saying that the Charlie Daniels Band played "some of all the music that's come across in America", particularly country, bluegrass, rock, gospel and jazz. Daniels also said "I refuse to be categorized because I think that puts blinders on you." Daniels' guitar playing was defined as having a "thick, buttery sound" which he achieved by stringing his Les Paul guitars with .10 gauge Gibson strings, and amplifying them through a Marshall cabinet.

Views

Daniels did not endorse any political candidates, and refused to express political views in his concerts. Regarding his views, Daniels said, "I do not consider myself political. I can understand why people would say what I write is political. It's not. It's just my feelings. It's common sense to me as an American citizen, which is not only our right, but our duty, really, to express our opinion, if no other way than at least in the voting booth. I don't do that on stage. I don't pay good money to go hear somebody talk about their political beliefs. It's just not part of my show. That is confined to the private part of my life, which I consider my writings on Twitter and [interviews]". However, in 1976, Daniels performed at campaign fundraisers for Jimmy Carter's presidential bid, and at his inauguration in January the following year; Daniels also initially supported the legalization of marijuana. In the following decade, however, Daniels expressed views that many considered to be right-wing and conservative. According to Forbes writer Seth Cohen, Daniels "frequently captured the pent-up frustrations of many Americans who felt that a "coastal elite" cadre of politicians and activists were moving the country farther away from some of its core values". According to Rolling Stone, Daniels had "plenty in common with moderates and liberals who supported Bernie Sanders, expressing disgust at Washington gridlock and a fervent belief in term limits for people in Congress so that fresh ideas keep coming." Daniels also supported "the idea that someone can criticize the president's decision making and not be called anti-American." 

Daniels was an outspoken Christian. Regarding the removal of Confederate monuments and memorials, Daniels said, "If tearing them down did any good, I'd be all for it. But I don't see where it does any good." Daniels also said that "when we pay attention to political correctness and things that don't really mean anything, we're wasting time, energy and political capital by not getting something meaningful done. We spend time chasing rainbows." In 2013, following chemical weapons attacks by Bashar al-Assad, and United States military response, Daniels wrote, "These and other questions need to be answered before any kind of action, bilateral or unilateral is taken. Otherwise, we will be right back in the same old Middle Eastern boiling pot again and I think everybody, doves and hawks alike, have had enough of that." After President Donald Trump's April 7, 2017 military strike against targets in Syria in retaliation for additional chemical weapon deployment, Daniels tweeted: "The world changed yesterday, America will no longer be viewed as a cowering toothless tiger." In 2019, Daniels lambasted New York Governor Andrew Cuomo for signing the Reproductive Health Act, which legalized abortion until birth under some circumstances, tweeting "Watch the wrinkles on Cuomo's face lengthen as the ramifications of the thousands of murders he has sanctioned come to bear on him. The NY legislature has created a new Auschwitz dedicated to the execution of a whole segment of defenseless citizens. Satan is smiling."

Personal life and death
Daniels married Hazel Juanita Alexander on September 20, 1964. They had one child, a son, Charles Edward Daniels Jr. An avid University of Tennessee sports fan, Daniels enjoyed hunting, fishing, snowmobiling, and other outdoor activities. He was a member of the National Rifle Association (NRA) and performed on their videos.

Daniels suffered a major arm injury on January 30, 1980, while digging fence post holes on his farm near Mount Juliet. He suffered three complete breaks in his right arm and two broken fingers when his shirtsleeve caught on a spinning power auger. The injury required surgery and sidelined him for four months.

Daniels was successfully treated for prostate cancer in 2001. On January 15, 2010, Daniels was rushed to the hospital after suffering a stroke while snowmobiling in Colorado. He was released two days later. During a doctor visit on March 25, 2013, Daniels was diagnosed with a mild case of pneumonia and admitted to a Nashville hospital for a series of routine tests. The tests revealed that a pacemaker was needed to regulate his heart rate. One was put in on March 28, and Daniels was released from the hospital within days.

Daniels died on July 6, 2020, at the age of 83 of a hemorrhagic stroke at Summit Medical Center in Hermitage, Tennessee.

Filmography 

 Heartworn Highways (1976) ... Himself
 Murder in Music City aka The County Western Murders (1979) ... Himself
 Urban Cowboy (1980) ... Himself
 Saturday Night Live (1982) ... Himself (Musical Guest)
 The Fall Guy (1983) ... Himself
 The Lone Star Kid (1985) ... Vernon Matthews
 Murder, She Wrote (1987) ... Stoney Carmichael
 Charlie Daniels' Talent Roundup (1994) ... Himself (Host)
 King of the Hill (2000) ... Himself (2 Episodes)
 18 Wheels of Justice (2000) ... Frank Schooler
 The Legend Lives On: A Tribute to Bill Monroe (2003) ... Himself
 Fox NFL Sunday (2005) - Super Bowl XXXIX Pregame Show ... Himself
 Veggietales (2005) ... Himself (Musical Guest) ("Minnesota Cuke and the search for Samson's hairbrush")
 Dinner: Impossible (2008) ... Himself
 Poliwood (2009) ... Himself
 A Twin Pines Christmas (2009) ... Himself
 Sweet Home Alabama: The Southern Rock Saga (2012) ... Himself
 Iron Will: Veterans Battle With PTSD (2016) ... Himself
 Floating Horses: The Life of Casey Tibbs (2017) ... Himself
 Country Music (2019) ... Himself

Discography

References

External links

 
 
 Charlie Daniels interview at AwaitingTheFlood.com
 Charlie Daniels interview at CountryMusicPride.com
 Charlie Daniels at Broadcast Music, Inc.
 

1936 births
2020 deaths
20th-century American guitarists
20th-century American male musicians
21st-century American male musicians
21st-century American violinists
American Christians
American country rock musicians
American country rock singers
American male actors
American male guitarists
American male singer-songwriters
American multi-instrumentalists
American rock guitarists
American session musicians
American Southern Rock musicians
Baptists from North Carolina
Capitol Records artists
Country Music Hall of Fame inductees
Epic Records artists
Grammy Award winners
Grand Ole Opry members
Guitarists from North Carolina
Kama Sutra Records artists
Liberty Records artists
Members of the Country Music Association
People from Chatham County, North Carolina
People from Wilmington, North Carolina
Reprise Records artists
Singer-songwriters from North Carolina
Southern Baptists
Southern rock fiddlers
Sparrow Records artists
Tennessee Republicans
The Charlie Daniels Band members